The 1971 Southern Conference men's basketball tournament took place from March 4–6, 1971 at the original Charlotte Coliseum in Charlotte, North Carolina. The Furman Paladins, led by head coach Joe Williams, won their first Southern Conference title and received the automatic berth to the 1971 NCAA tournament.

Format
All of the conference's seven members were eligible for the tournament. Teams were seeded based on conference winning percentage. The tournament used a preset bracket consisting of three rounds, with the top finisher receiving a first-round bye.

Bracket

* Overtime game

See also
List of Southern Conference men's basketball champions

References

Tournament=
Southern Conference men's basketball tournament
Southern Conference men's basketball tournament
Southern Conference men's basketball tournament
Basketball competitions in Charlotte, North Carolina
College sports tournaments in North Carolina
College basketball in North Carolina